Pedro Andrés Morales Flores (born 25 May 1985) is a Chilean former footballer who played as a midfielder.

He began his professional career with Huachipato before moving to Universidad de Chile, and in 2007 was signed by Dinamo Zagreb of Croatia. After a loan back at Universidad de Chile and Spanish club Málaga, he spent a season with the latter before moving to Vancouver Whitecaps FC, where he served as a captain from 2014 until his departure.

Morales first represented Chile in the 2005 FIFA World Youth Championship, making his senior international debut later in 2008.

Club career

Chile
Morales began his career with Huachipato in 2004, quickly developing into an important player for the club. His outstanding performance in the U-20 World Cup helped Morales make the switch from Huachipato to Universidad de Chile, one of Chile's oldest and most popular clubs. He made his debut in the summer of 2007, right before the Chilean Clausura tournament. His presence, quick feet and leadership skills allowed him to regularly play alongside Chile's top national team scorer, ex Juventus and Lazio center forward, Marcelo Salas. Morales finished the 5-month tournament as the second top scorer in the league with 13 goals.

Dinamo Zagreb and Málaga

Morales signed a five-year contract with GNK Dinamo Zagreb on 11 June 2008. After a first season of average performances, in his second season he established himself as one of Dinamo's main players. During his time at Dinamo he helped the club to three straight league titles.

After disappointing performances and injury problems, Dinamo loaned Morales to Universidad de Chile. He regained his best form in Chile helping Universidad in capturing the 2012 Apertura which led to another loan, back to Europe where he joined Málaga CF. On 11 June 2013, he signed a two-year contract with Málaga.

Vancouver Whitecaps FC 

On 5 March 2014 Morales was acquired by the Vancouver Whitecaps FC in Major League Soccer, for €300,000. He was signed as the club's third Designated Player, after Kenny Miller and Matías Laba. He made his debut four days later, assisting the third goal and scoring the fourth in a 4–1 win over reigning Supporters' Shield champions the New York Red Bulls at BC Place. Vancouver finished fifth in the Western Conference, and lost to fourth-place FC Dallas in the knockout round for the MLS Cup Playoffs. Morales scored 10 goals in 34 matches, in addition to 12 assists, winning the MLS Newcomer of the Year Award.

Morales left the Whitecaps on 7 December 2016. He left the team as the second top scorer of the Whitecaps with 25 goals behind Camilo Sanvezzo and leads with assists of 22.

Colo-Colo 
In January 2017, Morales signed with Chilean club Colo-Colo on a free transfer.

International career
In January 2008, Morales was called up to the Chile national team by Marcelo Bielsa. The tour consisted of 2 friendlies where Chile beat South Korea 1–0 in Seoul and had a goalless draw with Japan at the Nissan Stadium. Morales played the full 90 minutes in both encounters.

A month later, Morales was called up to represent Chile in the prestigious 8-team, U23 Toulon tournament in France. He was chosen the 2nd best player of the tournament and scored what was voted as the tournament's best goal, thanks to a strike from the behind the half in a semifinal against Cote d'Ivoire. Morales's size, technique, goals, and assists allowed Chile to make it to the final where they conceded a 1–0 loss to Italy, in a highly contested encounter where Morales was able to rid himself of all nearby defenders and shoot a 25-yard rocket that hit the Italian post in the dying minutes of the game.

International goals

Honours
Dinamo Zagreb
Prva HNL: 2008–09, 2009–10, 2010–11
Croatian Football Cup: 2008–09, 2010–11
Croatian Football Super Cup: 2010

Universidad de Chile
Chilean Primera División: 2012
Copa Chile: 2012−13

Vancouver Whitecaps FC
Canadian Championship: 2015

Individual
MLS Newcomer of the Year Award: 2014
Vancouver Whitecaps FC Player of the Year: 2014

References
 Pedro Morales 
 Pedro Morales signs for Dinamo

Notes

External links

 
 
 

1985 births
Living people
People from Concepción Province, Chile
Chilean footballers
Chilean expatriate footballers
Chile international footballers
Chile under-20 international footballers
C.D. Huachipato footballers
Universidad de Chile footballers
GNK Dinamo Zagreb players
Málaga CF players
Vancouver Whitecaps FC players
Colo-Colo footballers
Universidad de Concepción footballers
Deportes Temuco footballers
Chilean Primera División players
Croatian Football League players
La Liga players
Major League Soccer players
Primera B de Chile players
Chilean expatriate sportspeople in Croatia
Chilean expatriate sportspeople in Spain
Chilean expatriate sportspeople in Canada
Chilean expatriate sportspeople in the United States
Expatriate footballers in Croatia
Expatriate footballers in Spain
Expatriate soccer players in Canada
Expatriate soccer players in the United States
Designated Players (MLS)
Association football midfielders